Warrick may refer to:

People

Given name

 Warrick Brown, fictional character on CSI: Crime Scene Investigation
 Warrick Brownlow-Pike (born 1985), British puppeteer
 Warrick Couch (born 1954), Australian astronomer
 Warrick Dunn (born 1975), American football running back
 Warrick Holdman (born 1975), American football linebacker
 Warrick Sony (born 1958)
 Warrick Burkholder (born 1992)

Surname

 Bryan Warrick (born 1959), American basketball player
 Delia Juanita Warrick (1942 – 2008), American soul singer
 Douglas Warrick, Oregon State University assistant professor
 Hakim Warrick (born 1982), American basketball player
 Harley Warrick, American barn painter - noted for Mail Pouch tobacco signs
 J. K. Warrick (born 1945), minister and general superintendent in the Church of the Nazarene
 Joby Warrick, (born August 4, 1960) American author, Pulitzer Prize-winning journalist
 Marie Dionne Warrick (born 1940) American singer, actress, TV-show host and United Nations Global Ambassador 
 Peter Warrick (born 1977), American football wide receiver
 Dr. Richard J. Warrick (born December 29, 1880), American co-founder of Sigma Pi Phi and former United States Civil Service examiner
 Ruth Warrick (1915–2005), American singer, actress and activist
 Wicket W. Warrick, Star Wars character

Other uses

 Warrick County, Indiana, United States
 Warrick County School Corporation, a public school-governing body
 Warrick Power Plant

See also
 Warwick (disambiguation)